Stephen Harding (dates of birth and death unknown) was a noted English cricketer of the mid-18th century who played for Chertsey, All-England and Surrey.  Harding was a hard-hitting batsman and a good bowler, although his style and pace is unknown.  He featured in single wicket contests and seems to have been a fine all-rounder.

Harding is first recorded in May 1751 when he played for All-England v Kent at the Artillery Ground.  All-England won by 9 runs and Harding made a significant contribution.  Although he had been picked as a bowler, he and an unnamed Chertsey player opened All-England's second innings and scored 51 for the first wicket, with Harding apparently making 50 of these himself and had one hit out of the ground and against a house on Bunhill Row opposite.  He was given four for this mighty effort.  You could only score six if you were actually able to run that many and to do that you would need the help of overthrows.

Soon afterwards, in a return match, Harding played for All-England again and they beat Kent by an innings.

In 1759, Harding was a member of the All-England team beaten twice by Dartford Cricket Club.

He was still making big hits in September 1765, when he played for Chertsey against Richmond on Richmond Green.  Helping Chertsey to win by 106 runs, Harding made 24 in four balls with a five, two sixes and a seven.

That is the last time he is recorded.  The bulk of his career was during the 1750s when cricket reports are scarce and he spanned the Seven Years' War which had a disastrous impact on the sport.

References

English cricketers
English cricketers of 1701 to 1786
Surrey cricketers
Year of birth unknown
Year of death unknown
Non-international England cricketers